Tomorrow's Eve is a progressive metal band, that originated from Germany. The band has released four albums, the first being in 1999. They have played live shows as recently as September 2019 at the ProgPower USA festival in Atlanta, GA USA.

Band members
 Martin LeMar – Vocals
 Rainer Grund – Guitar
 Oliver Schwickert – Keys
 Benedikt Zimniak – Bass
 Tim Korycki – Drums

Discography

External links
Website
Interview with Martin LeMar
Facebook

German progressive metal musical groups